Mozdoksky (masculine), Mozdokskaya (feminine), or Mozdokskoye (neuter) may refer to:
Mozdoksky District, a district of the Republic of North Ossetia–Alania, Russia
Mozdokskoye Urban Settlement, a municipal formation which Mozdok Town Under District Jurisdiction in Mozdoksky District of the Republic of North Ossetia–Alania, Russia is incorporated as
Mozdoksky Uyezd, an administrative division of Caucasus Governorate in the Russian Empire
Mozdoksky (rural locality), a rural locality (a khutor) in Stavropol Krai, Russia